Sabulodes niveostriata is a species of geometrid moth in the family Geometridae. It is found in North America.

The MONA or Hodges number for Sabulodes niveostriata is 7000.

References

Further reading

 

Ourapterygini
Articles created by Qbugbot
Moths described in 1893